The Catalan Institute of Nanoscience and Nanotechnology (ICN2) is a foundation located on the campus of the Autonomous University of Barcelona (UAB) whose mission is to promote interdisciplinary research in nanoscience and nanotechnology. In addition to research activities, the ICN2 provides training for researchers, education programs and services to industry and the scientific community.

The ICN2 is part of the Catalan Government's organization for research centers (CERCA)  which aims to encourage and maximize synergies and strategic cooperation between research centers in Catalonia. The Institute is also a founding member of The Barcelona Institute of Science and Technology which was established in collaboration with five other research centers in Catalonia to achieve greater international competitiveness by promoting multidisciplinary scientific collaboration in the fields of genomic regulation, chemical research, nanoscience and nanotechnology, photonic sciences, high energy physics, and biomedicine.

History 

The ICN2 was initially established as the Catalan Institute of Nanotechnology (ICN) in 2003, at the initiative of the Catalan government and the UAB with the aim of attracting international research talent to create a world-renowned center for nanoscience and nanotechnology research.
The Spanish Research Council (CSIC) showed interest in participating in the implementation of a mixed center that would include the ICN and the CSIC. Following conversations between these institutions, they agreed to put their collaboration on an official footing and signed a memorandum of understanding to this effect in 2006. As a result of this agreement, the Centre for Research in Nanoscience and Nanotechnology (CIN2) was created, a centre co-directed by Jordi Pascual (ICN) and Albert Figueras (CSIC).

The complete integration of the two constituent parts of this center arrived in 2011, when CSIC representatives joined the ICN's board of trustees and then in 2013, when the ICN changed its name to the Catalan Institute of Nanoscience and Nanotechnology (ICN2). In addition to research, management and financial synergies, an important outcome of this agreement was the construction of a new building on the UAB campus containing purpose-built research facilities. The building was inaugurated in 2014 and currently accommodates most of the ICN2 staff. This includes 280 people, comprising about 170 researchers and technicians, 70 temporary external visitors, and around 40 administrative staff.

Research 

Research at the ICN2 is carried out by the following multi-disciplinary research groups:

Scientific-Technical Research Support 
The ICN2 has a Research Support Division that provides shared access to specialized equipment, services, and expertise. It consists of three research support units and a set of technical facilities run by specialized technicians. Besides providing expertise and service to researchers, the units develop novel experimental equipment, setups and techniques.

The Core Research Facilities constitute a body of specialised equipment and are even more service-oriented than the units.

Research Training  
The ICN2 runs training programs for researchers in nanotechnology including studentships, doctoral and post-doctoral positions. It also provides custom training courses for technicians, R&D personnel and administrative personnel.

Knowledge and Technology transfer 
ICN2 promotes the exploitation of its research results and facilities and works with local and international companies to facilitate the uptake of nanotechnology. A substantial part of the investigation activities developed at the ICN2 are oriented to generate relevant nanotechnology patents and licensing opportunities. The institute is also involved in spinoff companies and provides a range of facilities and services to support research and innovation carried out by its partners.

Organization & Leadership 
The ICN2 is led by its director, Prof. Pablo Ordejón, who reports to a Board of Trustees comprising representatives from the Catalan Government, the Spanish Research Council (CSIC) and the Autonomous University of Barcelona (UAB).
Research is led by 18 group leaders who each coordinate and direct the activities of a multidisciplinary research team with the support of specialised laboratory engineers, technicians and 8 administrative and service departments led by Lluís Bellafont.
The ICN2's strategic research programs are reviewed and evaluated by an independent Scientific Advisory Board (SAB) made up of international scientists with experience in nanoscience and nanotechnology from the public and private sectors.

Awards 

In 2014, the ICN2 was accredited as a 'Severo Ochoa Centre of Excellence' by the Spanish Ministry of Economy and Competitiveness for the period 2014-2018, in recognition of the ICN2's international scientific impact, potential for attracting international talent and its contribution to the transfer and dissemination of knowledge to society. The award was renewed in 2018 for the 2018-2022 period.

Outreach 
Education for schools. The ICN2 participates in educational programs designed to increase understanding of nanoscience and the social and scientific role of ICN2. It is worth highlighting its role in the NanoEduca programme, carried out jointly with the University of Barcelona, the Autonomous University of Barcelona and the CESIRE (an educational research centre of the Government of Catalonia). The program includes interactive classroom kits for nanoscience-related experiments and was awarded the 2018 National Scientific Communication Prize.
 
Education in the community. ICN2 holds seminars and workshops to bring together scientists, engineers, technicians, business people and policy makers. The ICN2 also disseminates its research results in the media and provides public forums for discussions on nanotechnology and the work of the ICN2.

Scientific Output 
During 2018, ICN2 researchers produced 172 indexed publications with an average impact factor of 8.86. Specifically, 136 of these articles were published in first-quartile journals, while 77 appeared in first-decile journals.

References 

Nanotechnology institutions
International research institutes
Science and technology in Spain
Autonomous University of Barcelona
Scientific organisations based in Spain
Research institutes in Europe
Research institutes in Catalonia